Rick van Drongelen (born 20 December 1998) is a Dutch professional footballer who plays as a centre-back for 2. Bundesliga club Hansa Rostock, on loan from Union Berlin.

Career
Van Drongelen is a youth exponent from Sparta Rotterdam. He made his team debut on 4 December 2015 against FC Volendam replacing Thomas Verhaar in extra time.

On 3 August 2017, Van Drongelen joined Bundesliga club Hamburger SV on a five-year deal. The transfer fee paid to Sparta Rotterdam was reported as €3 million.

On 15 June 2021, Van Drongelen signed with Union Berlin. On 31 January 2022, Van Drongelen was loaned to Mechelen until the end of the season.

Career statistics

Honours
Sparta Rotterdam
 Eerste Divisie: 2015-16

References

1998 births
Living people
People from Terneuzen
Association football central defenders
Dutch footballers
Netherlands youth international footballers
Eredivisie players
Eerste Divisie players
Sparta Rotterdam players
Hamburger SV players
1. FC Union Berlin players
K.V. Mechelen players
Bundesliga players
2. Bundesliga players
Belgian Pro League players
Footballers from Zeeland
Dutch expatriate footballers
Dutch expatriate sportspeople in Germany
Expatriate footballers in Germany
Dutch expatriate sportspeople in Belgium
Expatriate footballers in Belgium